The Art of Thinking Clearly is a 2013 book by the Swiss writer Rolf Dobelli which describes in short chapters 99 of the most common thinking errors – ranging from cognitive biases to envy and social distortions. 

The book was written as weekly columns in leading newspapers in Germany, the Netherlands, and Switzerland, and later in two German books. The book was in the top ten of Germany's Der Spiegel Bestseller list for 80 consecutive weeks and has been translated into many languages. Outside Germany and Switzerland, the book hit the top ten bestseller lists in the U.K, South Korea, India, Ireland, Singapore, and Iran. Author Nassim Taleb has asserted that the book included sections plagiarised from Taleb's manuscript of Antifragile.

See also
 List of cognitive biases
 The Demon-Haunted World

References

External links
 

2013 non-fiction books
Books about cognition
Sceptre (imprint) books
Farrar, Straus and Giroux books